China National Highway 307 (G307) runs west from Qikou, Hebei towards Shanxi Province, Shaanxi Province, and ends in Yinchuan, Ningxia. It is 1,351 kilometres in length.

Route and distance

See also 

 China National Highways

Transport in Hebei
Transport in Shanxi
Transport in Shaanxi
Transport in Ningxia
307